The Shark is the nickname of the following people:

Roger Bernadina (born 1984), Major League Baseball player from Curaçao
Humberto Brenes (born 1951), Costa Rican professional poker player 
Brydon Coverdale, Australian television personality
Kenneth Gant (born 1967), American former National Football League player 
Greg Norman (born 1955), Australian professional golfer
Jeff Samardzija (born 1985), Major League Baseball pitcher
Mark Shrader (born 1967), American former professional wrestler
Mark Shelton, heavy metal guitarist and founder of the band Manilla Road
Michele Sindona (1920–1986), an Italian banker and convicted felon
John Tenta (1963–2006), a Canadian professional wrestler and sumōtori 
Mark Titus (born 1987), American blogger and former college basketball player
Mark Coulston (born 1987), Australian suburban cricket battler, two time McIntosh Shield premiership player and all round good guy

See also
Jerry Tarkanian (born 1930), American retired college basketball head coach known as "Tark the Shark"
Mark Selby (born 1983), English professional snooker and pool player known as "Mark the Shark"

Lists of people by nickname